The year 1717 in architecture involved some significant events.

Buildings and structures

Buildings

 The Sanmon gate of Taiseki-ji temple on the lower slopes of Mount Fuji, Japan, is built with donations from Tenneiin, the wife of sixth shōgun Tokugawa Ienobu.
 Bluecoat Chambers (school) in Liverpool, England, is first completed.
 Bluecoat School, Chester, England, is built.
 Steeple of St Mary le Strand church in London, designed by James Gibbs, is completed.
 The Wayside in Concord, Massachusetts (later home of Nathaniel Hawthorne and Louisa May Alcott) is first recorded.
 Construction of the Basilica of Superga begins in the Kingdom of Savoy.
 The first stone of the Mafra National Palace is laid on the 17th of November with a grand ceremony and the presence of King John V of Portugal.

Births
 July 14 – Ventura Rodríguez, Spanish architect (died 1785)
 August 11 – Giovanni Carlo Galli-Bibiena, Italian architect, designer and painter (died 1760)
 c. October – James Paine, English architect (died 1789)
 Adriano Cristofali, Veronese architect (died 1788)

Deaths

architecture
Years in architecture
18th-century architecture